This is a list of books in the English language which deal with Guernsey and its  geography, history, inhabitants, culture, biota, etc.

Allisette R. - Islanders Kitbags
Alvarez J.E. - German Occupation of the Channel Islands
Anderson, O. D. – Analysing Time Series: Proceedings of the International Conference Held in Guernsey, Channel Islands, in October 1979.
Ansted, David Thomas and Robert Gordon Latham – The Channel Islands.
A Bibliographical Guide to the Law of the United Kingdom, the Channel Islands, and the Isle of Man.
Antill J.K. - A bibliography of the German Occupation of the CHannel Islands
Bachmann K.M. - The Prey of an Eagle
Backhurst M-L. - Tracing your Channel Island Ancestors
Barbet S. - Barbets guide to the Island of Guernsey
Bell W. - Guernsey Occupied but never Conquered, 
Bell W.M. - I beg to report, 
Bell W.M. The Commando who came to stay
Bell W.M. - Guernsey Green, 
Berry W. - The history of the Island of Guernsey
Best M. - A family business
Bichard J & McClintock — Wild flowers of the Channel Islands
Bicknell E.E. - The little guides — the Channel Islands
Bihet M — A Child's War
Bihet M. - Reflections of Guernsey
Bihet M. - A time for memories: The Dame of Sark and Islanders lives remembered
Billing J — The hidden places of the Channel Islands
Binding T. - Island madness
Binding T. - Lying with the enemy, 
Black C.B. - Blacks guide to the Channel Islands
Blampied G. - Mayday Mayday a history of the Guernsey lifeboat station, 
Blicq R. - Au revoir, Sarnia Cherie, 
Bonnard B. - Alderney at War, 
Bonnard B. - Wrecked around Alderney, the Stories of Retired Alderney Pilot, Jack Quinain, 
Bonnard B & J — A natural history of Guernsey, Alderney, Sark and Herm
Bonser N.R.P — The Guernsey Railway, 
Bonser N.R.P. The Guernsey Railway the German occupation lines
Brett C.E.B. - National Trust of Guernsey. Buildings in the Town and Parish of St Peter Port
Briggs A. - The Channel Islands Occupation and Liberation, 
Brock C. - Clear shining after the rain — a Guernsey story
Broomhead R. - Jersey and Guernsey
Bunting M — The model occupation
Campbell, Alfred S. – Golden Guernsey.
Carey E. - The Channel Islands
Carmen W.J. - Channel Island Transport a history of public transportin Alderney, Guernsey and Jersey by road and rail  from 1788 to 1987
Chaney, Edward - "Genius Friend: G.B. Edwards and The Book of Ebenezer Le Page" (Blue Ormer, 2015) 
Channel Islands Occupation Society — Occupation Review — annual publication
Clarke L. - Tourist's guide to the Channel Islands
Clarke L. - Sark Discovered
Closs A. - Tastes of the Channel Islands
Cochrane J. - Life on Sark: Through the year
Cohen F. - The Jews in the Channel Islands During the German Occupation 1940-1945
Collenette V. - Elizabeth College in Exile 1940-45
Compton R. - The Complete Book of Traditional Guernsey and Jersey Knitting
Cook C. - The Guilberts of Hauteville
Coombe, Simon - "John Wilson, Guernsey's Architect: A Celebration" (Blue Ormer, 2018) 
Cooper B. - The Battle of the Torpedo Boats, 
Cortviend V.V. - Isolated Island — A historical and personal reminiscence of the German occupation of the Island of Guernsey June 1940 - May 1945
Cox, Gregory Stevens - "St Peter Port 1680-1830: The History of an International Entrepot" (Boydell & Brewer, 1999) 
Cox, Gregory Stevens - "Guernsey Merchants and their World" (Toucan Press, 2009) 
Cox, Gregory Stevens - "Victor Hugo's St Peter Port" (Blue Ormer, 2018) 
Coysh V. - Swastika over Guernsey
Coysh V. - Guernsey
Coysh V. -Alderney
Coysh V. - The Channel Islands — a new study
Coysh V. - Call of the Island — Guernsey Remembered
Coysh V. - Channel Islets
Coysh V. - The Bailiwick of Guernsey, the Jubilee Years, 1952-1977
Coysh V. - Royal Guernsey — a history of the Royal Guernsey Militia
Coysh V. - Old Guernsey in Pictures including Alderney, Sark, Herm and Jethou
Coysh V. - Sark — the last stronghold of feudalism
Coysh V. - Visitor's Guide, Guernsey, Alderney & Sark
Coysh V. & Toms C. - Bygone Guernsey, 
Coysh V. & Toms C. - Guernsey — through the lens again
Cruickshank, Charles – The German Occupation of the Channel Islands.
Curtis S. - An account of the discovery of a cist or Dolmen of a type novel to Guernsey
de Garis, Marie – Folklore of Guernsey.
de Sausmarex, Haviland de – The Extentes of Guernsey, 1248 to 1331, and Other Documents Relating to Ancient Usages and Customs in That Island.
Dobson, Roderick – The Birds of the Channel Islands.
Durand, Ralph;– Guernsey under German Rule. (Guernsey Society, 1946), 2nd ed. (Guernsey Society, 2018)
Dury, G. – The Channel Islands.
Eagleston, A. J. – The Channel Islands under Tudor Government, 1485-1642: A Study in Administrative History. (Cambridge University Press for the Guernsey Society, 1949)
Falla, Frank - "The Silent War", 4th ed. (Blue Ormer, 2018) 
Fleure, H. J. – British Landscape Through Maps. 3: Guernsey.
Foster, Stephen - "Zoffany's Daughter: Love and treachery on a small island" (Blue Ormer, 2017) 
Forty, George - "Channel Islands at War"
Forty, George - "German Occupation of the Channel Islands"
Fraser, David – The Jews of the Channel Islands and the Rule of Law, 1940-1945: 'Quite contrary to the Principles of British Justice'.
Frossard, Cannon E.L. - "The German Occupation of Guernsey"
Gallienne, Osmond - "My Life in Guernsey"
Gavey, Ernie - "German fortifications in Guernsey"
Ginns, Michael - "German tunnels in the Channel Islands"
Girard, Peter - "Peter Girard's Guernsey"
Girard, Peter - "More of Peter Girard's Guernsey"
Goudge, Elizabeth - "Island Magic"
Goudge, Elizabeth - "Green Dolphin Country"
Guernsey Society, members of "The Guernsey Farmhouse" (De La Rue for the Guernsey Society, 1963)
Gurney, David - "Postal History of the Guernsey Sub-Post Offices"
Harris, J. Theodore and Sidney Webb – An Example of Communal Currency: the Facts about the Guernsey Market House.
Hocart, Richard – An Island Assembly: The Development of the States of Guernsey, 1700-1949.
Horwood, A. R. – A Hand-list of the Lichens of Great Britain, Ireland and the Channel Islands.
Hugo, George W.J.L. - "Guernsey As It Used To Be: A Tour of the Town in Victorian Times" (Blue Ormer, 2017) 
Jamieson, A. G. – A People of the Sea: The Maritime History of the Channel Islands.
Jee, Nigel – The Landscape of the Channel Islands.
Johnston, Peter, A Short History of Guernsey, 6th ed. (Guernsey Society, 2014).
Keeton, G. W., Dennis Lloyd, and George W. Keeton – The British Commonwealth: The Development of Its Laws and Constitutions, Volume 1: The United Kingdom, Part 2: Scotland and the Channgel Islands.
Kendrick, T. D. – The Archaeology of the Channel Islands. In 2 Vols. Vol. 1. The Bailiwick of Guernsey.
King, Peter – The Channel Islands War, 1940-1945.
Le Patourel, J. H. – The Medieval Administration of the Channel Islands, 1199-1399.
Liddicoat, Anthony – A Grammar of the Norman French of the Channel Islands: The Dialects of Jersey and Sark.
Lockley, R. M. – The Charm of the Channel Islands.
Lyle, Lillian – The Marine Algae of Guernsey.
MacCulloch, Edgar and Edith F. Carey – Guernsey Folk Lore.
Maxwell, W. Harold and Leslie F. Maxwell – A Legal Bibliography of the British Commonwealth of Nations, Volume 1: English Law to 1800, including Wales, the Channel Islands and the Isle of Man.
McClintock, D. – The Life of Joshua Gosselin of Guernsey.
McClintock, David – Guernsey's Earliest Flora: Flora Samiensis by Joshua Gosselin.
McClintock, David – The Wild Flowers of Guernsey.
McLaughlin, Roy;- The Sea was their Fortune 1997  
Morris, Joseph E. – Beautiful Britain: The Channel Islands.
Ogier, Darryl M. – Reformation and Society in Guernsey.
Perrin, William F., Bernd Würsig & J. G. M. Thewissen – Encyclopedia of Marine Mammals.
Peterson, C. D., D. A. Pearlman, T. D. Dines, H. R. Arnold, and Jane M. Croft – New Atlas of the British & Irish Flora: An Atlas of the Vascular Plants of Britain, Ireland, the Isle of Man and the Channel Islands.
Ramisch, Heinrich – Variation of English in Guernsey/Channel Islands.
Ramsey, Winston G. – The War in the Channel Islands: Then and Now.
Richard, John D. and David McClintock – Wild Flowers of the Channel Islands.
Sheridan, L. A. – The United Kingdom: The Development of Its Laws and Constitution: The Channel Islands.
Sinel, Joseph – Prehistoric Times and Men of the Channel Islands.
Uttley, John – The Story of the Channel Islands.
Warren, J. P. – Our Own Island: A Descriptive Account of Guernsey.

Footnotes

Guernsey
Guernsey
Books about the Channel Islands